Tereza Pergnerová (born 25 June 1974) is a Czech actress, singer and television presenter. She presented the 2012 reality television show Farma. She has two children, having given birth to a son in 2000 and a daughter in 2008.

Selected filmography
Accumulator 1 (1991)
Žiletky (1994)

References

External links

1974 births
Living people
Actresses from Prague
Musicians from Prague
Czech television actresses
21st-century Czech women  singers
Czech film actresses
20th-century Czech actresses
21st-century Czech actresses
Czech women television presenters